Sherie Merlis (born Sharifah Saadah Wan Zainal Abidin; 23 October 1972) is a Malaysian actress. Her acting career began in 1989 and has received nominations in the Malaysia Film Festival, Screen Awards and Asian Film Awards.

Life and career
Born in Sibu, Sarawak, she is the third of five siblings in an ethnic Malay family. Her parents are Wan Zainal Kassim Tuanku Zainal Abidin and Raden Kasron Aini. On her father's side, Sherie is of Arab and Sarawakian Malay descent, and on her mother's side she is of  Pontianak Malay  and Chinese descent. Her mother is related to the Pontianak Sultanate of Borneo.  Merlis is the daughter of Wan Kassim Tuanku Zainalabidin and Raden Kasron Aini. At the age of 17, Sherie Merlis started working as an actor in Kuala Lumpur, Malaysia.

In 2012 she married music producer Tengku Shafiz Rullah As Syafiee (former husband of Dira Abu Zahar), also known as Ash. They have two children: Tengku Kaseh Anaqah, born on July 1, 2012 and Tengku Areef Bolkiah As Syafiee, born on January 21, 2014.

Filmography

Film

Television series

Telemovie

Awards and nominations
 Screen Awards 2012 (ASK 2012) category of Best Supporting Actress Drama - Di Telapak Kaki Bonda directed by Kabir Bhatia.

References

External links
 

Malaysian people of Malay descent
Malaysian people of Arab descent
1972 births
Living people
21st-century Malaysian actresses
20th-century Malaysian actresses
People from Sarawak